Daniel Lloyd may refer to:
Daniel Lewis Lloyd (1843–1899), schoolteacher and cleric
Dan Lloyd (American football) (born 1953), NFL linebacker for the New York Giants
Daniel B. Lloyd, U.S. Navy admiral
Danny Lloyd (born 1972), American child actor
Daniel Lloyd (cyclist) (born 1980), English professional road racing cyclist
Daniel Lloyd (actor and musician) (born 1982), bilingual Welsh actor and singer-songwriter
Daniel Lloyd (Nigerian actor), Nigerian actor
Danny Lloyd (footballer) (born 1991), English professional footballer
Daniel Lloyd (footballer) (born 1992), Australian rules footballer
Daniel Lloyd (racing driver) (born 1992), British racing car driver

See also
Danielle Lloyd (born 1983), English glamour model